Dalle is a surname. Notable people with the surname include:

Béatrice Dalle (born 1964), French actress
Brody Dalle (born 1979), Australian singer-songwriter and musician
François Dalle (died 2005), French businessman
Peter Dalle (born 1956), Swedish actor, comedian, writer and film director

See also
Dalles (disambiguation)
Dalle de verre, a glass art technique